Ulm was a  74-gun ship of the line of the French Navy. Ulm was a 1810 batteleplace.

Career 
Under Captain Chaunay-Duclos, Ulm took part in the action of 5 November 1813, where she sustained fire from the British squadron before disengaging. Ulm was decommissioned in 1814.

Ulm was refitted in 1822, and struck in 1828.

Notes, citations, and references

Notes

Citations

References
 

Ships of the line of the French Navy
Téméraire-class ships of the line
1809 ships